Die Wächter is a 1970 dystopian novel The Guardians (German title: Die Wächter) by the English author John Christopher. He portrays the fate of Rob Randalls, a boy living in a two-class society.

The novel was awarded the German youth literature prize in 1976.

Plot summary 
England of the 21st century is divided into two regions. One is the frantic and advanced Konurba, the other is the region in which humans live under pre-WWI conditions. The people of the two regions do not know each other because a fence marks the border of both sides. That is why both sides' population is suspicious of each other. Rob Randall, a boy from Konurba, lives together with father ever since his mother died. After his father died in an accident, the boy is sent to a public boarding school. But because of dominantly brutal customs Rob runs away from the boarding school. He decides flee to the region his mother grew up in. After arriving there Rob meets the son of country aristocrats, Mike Gifford who agrees to hide Rob in a cave. When Mike's mother finds the Rob she decides after initial hesitation to offer Rob to live with the family as an allegedly "nephew from Nepal". The boy is fast to settle into the life of country aristocrats and attends school together with Mike starting in September. There they get to know Daniel Penfold, an upperclassman who criticises social order. Whilst Mike is starting to develop an interest in Penfold's ideas, Rob confronts these ideas sceptically.

Interpretation 
The author depicts a two-class society in this novel. The whole system is based on prejudices both groups of people have against each other. Christopher also shows what happens when something is seen as perfect and thus making people overlook their own mistakes. This denial of reality and prejudices are creating a social order in which people are happy on their own, showing no interest in others. The author wants to make the reader to question seemingly perfect conditions instead of accept them without a second thought.

Television adaptation 
In 1985, Die Wächter was made into a television series of six episodes with a runtime of 45 minutes per episode. The producing company was the Bavaria Atelier GmbH. The cast included Martin Tempest as Rob Randall, Renate Schroeter as Mrs. Gifford, Paul Hawkins as Mike Gifford, and Sophie Lawrence as Cecily Gifford. The television series aired on the German television channel ARD from February until March 1986.

Literature 
 Die Wächter by John Christopher, published by Ravensburger Verlag, .

See also
List of German television series

External links
 
 Review of Die Wächter
 Review of the novel Die Wächter at Dystopische Literatur
 Die Wächter D 1985 TV series

1986 German television series debuts
1986 German television series endings
German science fiction television series
1980s German television miniseries
Television shows based on British novels
German-language television shows
Das Erste original programming

de:Die Wächter